This is a list of seasons of Linköping-based Swedish ice hockey club Linköping HC.

Lin